Drągowina  is a village in the administrative district of Gmina Nowogród Bobrzański, within Zielona Góra County, Lubusz Voivodeship, in western Poland.

The village has an approximate population of 600.

References

Villages in Zielona Góra County